Acrochordonichthys rugosus is a species of catfish of the family Akysidae. It inhabits clear, swiftly flowing forested streams of Thailand, Malaysia and Indonesia. A detailed discussion of this species's relationship with the other members of its genus can be found on Acrochordonichthys.

References

Akysidae
Freshwater fish of Indonesia
Freshwater fish of Malaysia
Fish of Thailand
Fish described in 1846